Kuuhankavesi is a medium-sized lake of Finland. It is located in Hankasalmi, Central Finland region. It belongs to the Kymijoki main catchment area.

See also
List of lakes in Finland

References

Kymi basin
Lakes of Hankasalmi